Mount Tarn is a small mountain located on the southernmost part of the Strait of Magellan, in  Brunswick Peninsula, about 70 km south of  Punta Arenas, Chile. It is in the southern extreme of continental Chile very close to Cape Froward, surrounded by historic places such as Fort Bulnes and Puerto del Hambre (Port Famine).

From the summit it is possible to see the Strait of Magellan,  Dawson and Tierra del Fuego islands, and many other smaller ones; the Darwin Mountain Range, Mount Sarmiento, and most of the Brunswick Peninsula.

Toponymy

According to historian Mateo Martinic Beros in his  book Cartografía Magallánica 1523-1945, the mount was named after the British surgeon, John Tarn, who first ascended the mountain in February 1827 while traveling with Robert FitzRoy on HMS Adventure and later ascended it while traveling with Phillip Parker King in HMS Beagle), during their surveying voyage from 1826 to 1830.

Tarn participated in a hydrographic survey conducted in the area, through the collection and classification of flora and fauna species.

Darwin's ascent
On 6 February 1834 a group from the second Beagle survey expedition, including Charles Darwin, ascended Mount Tarn by forcing their way up through dense woodland to the bare ridge which took them to the summit. He recounted the story in his Journal and Remarks. In his ascent the young naturalist found the first ammonites ever known in South America.

See also
Magallanes Province
Magallanes Region
Parrillar lagoon
San Juan river
San Isidro lighthouse
Cape Froward.

References

 Instituto Geográfico Militar Chart, Chile: Rinconada Bulnes, scale 1:100000, Section L, 1987.

 
 Biogeografía del monte Tarn, Magallanes, Chile. Trabajo final de carrera, ETSIAM, Universidad Politécnica de Valencia. Escuela técnica superior de ingenieros agrónomos. Ingeniería de Montes, especialidad Ingeniería del Medio Natural. Universidad de Magallanes. Facultad de Ciencias. Sergio Navarro Cano y Javier González. 2006
 Cartografía Magallánica 1523-1945, Mateo Martinic Beroš, 1999, Punta Arenas, Chile. .

External links
Mount Tarn Description & Route in AndesHandbook (in Spanish)
Tarn ascent in blogger.com  (in Spanish)

Photo gallery

Tarn
Tarn
Brunswick Peninsula